Strangers All is a 1935 American drama film directed by Charles Vidor from a screenplay by Milton Krims.  The film stars May Robson and Preston Foster, and was released by RKO Radio Pictures on April 26, 1935.

References

Films produced by Cliff Reid
Films directed by Charles Vidor
RKO Pictures films
American drama films
1935 drama films
1935 films
American black-and-white films
1930s American films